Albert Thomas DeRome (1885-1959) was an American oil and watercolor painter from California. He was the subject of a retrospective exhibition at the Grace Hudson Museum in 2005.

Further reading

References

1885 births
1959 deaths
People from San Luis Obispo, California
American male painters
American watercolorists
Painters from California
20th-century American painters
20th-century American male artists